The Imota rice mill is an agricultural plant in Ikorodu, a suburb of Lagos, Nigeria. It was built in 2021 and will commence full production in the forth quarter of 2022.

Description 

The rice mill in Imota is 22 hectares big, with the mill itself occupying 8.5 hectares. It will be the largest mill in Africa and the third largest mill in the world. The rice mill has a capacity to produce 2.8 million bags of 50kg bags of rice yearly, while generating 1,500 direct jobs and 254,000 indirect jobs. On completion, in line with the estimated installed infrastructure of the facility, the production capacity of the rice mill in Imota will set it among the largest in the world, and the largest in sub-Saharan Africa.

It is an integrated mill with two warehouses and 16 silos (each with a capacity of 2,500 tonnes, 25 metres high, 40-year life). The mill operates in two lines that receive, pre-clean, boil, dry, sort, hull, polish and bag the rice. According to Demola Amure, senior partner, the mill is described as the "Rolls-Royce" of rice mills. The quality of the rice "will be second to none".

Only local staff were used for the assembly.

Inauguration 
May 29th, 2022, Ms Abisola Olusanya, the state Commissioner for Agriculture, assured that the Imota rice mill would be inaugurated "in 10 weeks" (which would be the first week of August 2022). ”Paddy is already there. (...) I can’t ascertain the figure but what I know is that the silos are being filled right now with paddy. They are already tested running the equipment." Ms Olusanya said.

Economic effect 
According to Lagos State governor Sanwo-Olu, full production of the facility will drastically reduce prices of rice and pressure to purchase the commodity. At this moment (early 2022) Nigeria produces husk rice, yet imports hulled/polished rice at a higher price. Processing the national staple food rice in its own country therefore should improve Nigeria's trade balance.

Technical process 
In a rice mill, primarily the cereals spelt, barley, oats, millet and rice are hulled, i.e. the husks that are firmly attached to the grain and do not fall off during threshing are removed (dehusking). The husks are indigestible for the human organism and would negatively influence the taste and chewing sensations. Furthermore, in a rice mill, the hulled cereal grains are usually also subsequently rolled (oat flakes), cut (groats) or polished (rice, rolled barley). Other possible processing steps are mostly identical to those in a grain mill.

Machinery 
The machines are from Bühler, a Swiss company that is one of the world's leading manufacturers of rice processing technologies. The plant is fully automated. The rice is not touched until it is packed into bags.

A local company, Henry Karll, installed the plant under the supervision of Bühler. They also train the operators. The project consultant, Faocon Nigeria Ltd, ensures that all parties work together harmoniously.

The water supply, treatment, filtration and reverse osmosis are being handled by a local company that has also worked for Coca-Cola, Pepsi and Nigerian Breweries.

Surroundings 
The State Government is also developing an industrial park adjacent to the mill. Governor Sanwo-Olu said the park would have amenities that would make businesses thrive and bring returns on investment to business owners.

Outlook 
In order to facilitate a seamless supply of input for the facility, Lagos will undertake a backward integration strategy in the form of collaboration with other Nigerian states such as Kwara, Sokoto, Benue, Borno and Kebbi to meet the paddy requirement of the mill.

The rice from Imota rice mill will go on sale in December 2022 under the trademark of "Eko rice". 

The price of a 50kg bag of rice has increased from 32,000 Naira (64 US-Dollars) to 48,000 Naira (96 US-Dollars) in the second half of 2022, representing 50% inflation as many Nigerian rice farms have been flooded in October 2022.

References

Ikorodu

Agriculture in Nigeria